The National Gospel Singing Convention is an annual Southern gospel music event, and has played a significant part in the development of Gospel music.

The convention was established by the most prominent publishers of shape note song books in 1936, including the Morris-Henson Company, the Vaughan Quartet, James D. Vaughan Music Publishers, the Hartford Music Company, A. J. Showalter Company, Denson Music Company, Theodore Sisk Music Company, Tennessee Music and Printing Company, George W. Sebren, W. P. Ganus, and the Stamps Baxter Music and Printing Company. The first event was held in 1936 in Atlanta, Georgia, with Adger M. Pace serving as the convention's first president. 

In 1949, the convention's constitution was revised so that state singing conventions would have voting privileges in addition to music publishers. In 1961, Stella Vaughan wrote an article for Vaughan's Family Visitor newsletter that chronicled the convention's first twenty-five years. The convention has continued as an annual event for more than 70 years, rotating among small towns throughout the United States (typically in the South). Lawrenceburg, Tennessee, home of the original Vaughan Publishing Company and generally regarded as the birthplace of Southern Gospel music since 1910, hosted the 1991, 1996, 2006, and 2015 conventions.

The current president of the convention is former president of the Georgia State Gospel Singing Convention, Cameron B. Holloway. The 2023 session will take place at the historic Orange United Methodist Church outside Canton, Georgia on November 17 and 18, 2023.

National Gospel Singing Convention

External links
 

Gospel music associations
Music festivals in the United States
Shape note
Southern gospel